The Defence Services Technological Academy (DSTA), located in Pyin-Oo-Lwin, Myanmar, is the premier technological university of the Myanmar Armed Forces. One of the most selective universities in the country, the academy offers various Bachelor of Engineering degrees to male cadets only. Upon graduation, most DSTA cadets are commissioned as Engineering Officers with the rank of Lieutenant in one of the three branches of Burmese armed forces--army, navy, and air force. Some qualified cadets may choose (or be chosen) to pursue further education in Yangon Technological University, Mandalay Technological University or abroad. Brigadier General Kyi Khine is the Commandant of Defense Services Technological Academy (DSTA).

History
The Defence Services Technological Academy was established as the Defence Services Institute of Technology (DSIT) on 1 February 1993 at Pyin Oo Lwin when all civilian colleges and universities in Myanmar were shut down by the military government, following the 1988 nationwide uprising. The military went on to establish a parallel system of colleges and universities for itself, including DSTA, Defence Services Medical Academy, and Defence Services Institute of Nursing and Paramedical Science. Lt. Col. Win Myint was assigned to carry out this duty.

The first "intake" of students graduated with Bachelor of Engineering (B.E.) degrees in 1999. The academy's graduation ceremonies, as with those of all other military-run academies, are attended by the highest ranks of the military government.

Admissions
As one of the elite military academies in Union of Myanmar, the academy maintains a rigorous selection process, including physical fitness testing, ability for teamwork and comradeship screening, psychometric and general interviews. The entrance selection process takes about 5 to 7 days at Myanmar Military Officer Selection Board in Yangon before 18th intake and after 18th intake, the entrance selection process takes about 5 days at "Officer Testing Team(OTT)" in Nay Pyi Taw.According to official statistics, DSTA takes 1 out of 145 applicants at selection process.

Programs
The academy offers six-year Bachelor of Engineering degree programs in various disciplines, but primarily in Mechanical Engineering and Electrical Engineering in addition to required cadet training.

Cadet training also includes basic military skills, including leadership, through a military programs that begins on their first day at DSTA. Cadets divided into one of two battalions--Anawrahta or Bayinnaung. Each battalion is divided into five companies, in the structure of Burmese army. Most military training takes place during the winter, with new cadets undergoing Cadet Basic Training--or Beast Barracks—the first year, followed by Cadet Field Training in the second year. Cadets are housed in barracks and have leadership positions and responsibilities throughout the academic year.

Campus

The DSTA campus is located in Wetwun, near Pyin-Oo-Lwin on the Mandalay-Lasho highway, and on the opposite side of town from its brother school, Defence Services Academy. DSTA is part of the military education facilities established around Pyin Oo Lwin area which is also home to Defence Services Administration School, and the Army Training Depot.

Engineering majors
 Marine electrical system and electronics - Myannar Navy
 Naval Architecture - Myannar Navy
 Marine - Myannar Navy
 Structure
 Transportation
 Water Resources
 Mechanical
 Electronics
 Electrical Power
 Mechatronics
 Aerospace electrical system and instrumentation - Myannar Air Force
 Aerospace Avionics - Myannar Air Force
 Aerospace Propulsion - Myannar Air Force
 Chemical
 Metallurgy

At 2015, There is no majors for Navy and Air force. Cadets from all majors are selected for Army, Navy, Air force.

See also
 Defence Services Academy
 Defence Services Medical Academy
 Defence Services Institute of Nursing and Paramedical Science
 Yangon Technological University
 Mandalay Technological University

References 

Universities and colleges in Pyinoolwin
Universities and colleges in Mandalay Region
Technological universities in Myanmar
Military academies of Myanmar
Universities and colleges in Myanmar
Educational institutions established in 1993
1993 establishments in Myanmar